1999 Dunhill Cup Vietnam was a friendly international football tournament held in Vietnam in 1999. It was the last edition of the Dunhill friendly tournaments. It was won by South Korea.

Although the tournament's participants both send their national squads, some teams like Bulgaria, China, South Korea, Russia and Iran sent mostly their Olympic players into the teams. They were all registered as the senior squads instead. Some notable international players, like Maksim Buznikin, Lee Dong-gook and Ali Karimi, participated in the tournament and would have become parts of their national squads later. For South Korea, the tournament was also a perpetration for the 2002 FIFA World Cup to be held in home soil.

Group stage

Group 1

{| class=wikitable style="text-align:center"
|-
!width="300"|Team
!width="20"|
!width="20"|
!width="20"|
!width="20"|
!width="20"|
!width="20"|
!width="20"|
!width="20"|
|- style="background:#cfc;"
|align=left|
|3||2||1||0||4||2||+2||7
|- style="background:#cfc;"
|align=left|
|3||1||1||1||7||4||+3||4
|- 
|align=left|
|3||1||1||1||3||2||+1||4
|- 
|align=left|
|3||0||1||2||1||7||−6||1
|}

Group 2

{| class=wikitable style="text-align:center"
|-
!width="300"|Team
!width="20"|
!width="20"|
!width="20"|
!width="20"|
!width="20"|
!width="20"|
!width="20"|
!width="20"|
|- style="background:#cfc;"
|align=left|
|3||3||0||0||10||2||+8||9
|- style="background:#cfc;"
|align=left|
|3||2||0||1||10||4||+6||6
|- 
|align=left|
|3||0||1||2||3||8||–5||1
|- 
|align=left|
|3||0||1||2||2||11||−9||1
|}

Knockout stage

Semi-finals

Final

Award

External links
 1999 Dunhill Cup Vietnam at RSSF.com website

International association football competitions hosted by Vietnam